The Niagara & District Junior C Hockey League is a former Junior "C" ice hockey league in Ontario, Canada, sanctioned by the Ontario Hockey Association.  The Champion of the Niagara competed for the All-Ontario Championship and the Clarence Schmalz Cup.

In the summer of 2016, the NDJCHL merged into the Provincial Junior Hockey League.

History

The Niagara & District Junior C Hockey League was formed in 1974.  Although corresponding with the founding of the Golden Horseshoe Junior Hockey League, the Niagara District league was actually founded by removing the Niagara-area teams from the Central Junior C Hockey League and placing them in the new Niagara District league.  The Central league is now known as the Western Ontario Junior C Hockey League.

In 1984, the entire Western Division of the league broke away and formed the Southwestern Junior C Hockey League.  The league only lasted one year before it was reabsorbed by the Niagara & District League.  The Southwestern league comprised teams from Norwich, Woodstock, Tillsonburg, Simcoe, and New Hamburg.  Local publications, like the Simcoe Reformer, did not recognize the Southwestern League as anything but the Western Division of the Niagara District league.

In the Spring of 2013, Junior C hockey in Ontario had its first major realignment since the creation of the Georgian Mid-Ontario Junior C Hockey League in 1994.  The 27 teams between the Niagara & District League and the Southern Ontario Junior Hockey League were reshuffled.  The Niagara & District League jumped from 12 to 18 teams, losing the Aylmer Spitfires, but gaining the Ayr Centennials, Burford Bulldogs, Delhi Travellers, Hagersville Hawks, Norfolk Rebels (Port Dover), Tavistock Braves, and Wellesley Applejacks.  Not long after, the OHA split off the Western Division of the Niagara League to form the new Midwestern Junior C Hockey League, taking long time Niagara League members the Woodstock Navy-Vets, New Hamburg Firebirds, Norwich Merchants, and Paris Mounties with them.

Teams

On hiatus:
St. George Dukes

2015-16 Playoffs
Winner moves on to the Clarence Schmalz Cup.

Niagara Junior "C" champions
Niagara District Junior C Champions are bolded.  In a year that there is no bolded champion, there seems to have not been an overall Niagara District Champion and both division entered teams against different opponents at the provincial level.  In 1985, the Western Division was known as the "Southwestern Junior C Hockey League".
{| cellpadding="1" width="600px" style="font-size: 90%; border: 1px solid gray;" 
| 

{| cellpadding="1" width="600px" style="font-size: 90%;" 
|- align="center"
! style="background: #CD5C5C;" width="40" |Year
! style="background: #CD5C5C;"  |East Champion
! style="background: #CD5C5C;"  |West Champion
! style="background: #CD5C5C;"  |Result in Provincials
|- align="center"
| 1988 || Stoney Creek Warriors || Woodstock Navy-Vets || Lost Semi-final vs. Mooretown (GL)
|- align="center"
| 1989 || Caledonia Corvairs || Dundas Blues || Caledonia Lost Quarter-final vs. Bradford (MO)Dundas Lost Quarter-final vs. Belle River (GL)
|- align="center"
| 1990 || Port Dover Clippers || New Hamburg Spirit 83's || Port Dover Lost Quarter-final vs. Orangeville (MO)New Hamburg Lost Quarter-final vs. Belle River (GL)
|- align="center"
| 1991 || Port Dover Clippers || New Hamburg Spirit 83's || Port Dover Lost Quarter-final vs. Orangeville (MO)New Hamburg Lost Quarter-final vs. Belle River (GL)
|- align="center"
| 1992 || Chippawa Merchants || Dundas Blues || Lost Semi-final vs. Belle River (GL)
|- align="center"
| 1993 || Dundas Blues || Woodstock Navy-Vets || Lost Semi-final vs. Napanee Raiders (E)
|- align="center"
| 1994 || Rockton Real McCoys || Woodstock Navy-Vets || Rockton Lost Final vs. Belle River (GL)Woodstock Lost Quarter-final vs. Belle River (GL)
|- align="center"
| 1995 || Chippawa Merchants || Woodstock Navy-Vets || Lost Semi-final vs. Belle River (GL)
|- align="center"
| 1996 || Glanbrook Rangers || Paris Mounties || Won Championship vs. Napanee (E)
|- align="center"
| 1997 || Glanbrook Rangers || Paris Mounties || Won Championship vs. Belle River (GL)
|- align="center"
| 1998 || Glanbrook Rangers || Norwich Merchants || Won Championship vs. Kincardine (W)
|- align="center"
| 1999 || Glanbrook Rangers || Woodstock Navy-Vets || Won Championship vs. Wallaceburg (GL)
|- align="center"
| 2000 || Chippawa Riverhawks || Norwich Merchants || Lost Semi-final vs. Lakefield (C)
|- align="center"
| 2001 || Chippawa Riverhawks || Norwich Merchants || Won Championship vs. Belle River (GL)
|- align="center"
| 2002 || Chippawa Riverhawks || Woodstock Navy-Vets || Lost Semi-final vs. Essex (GL)
|- align="center"
| 2003 || Grimsby Peach Kings || Norwich Merchants || Won Championship vs. Georgina (C)
|- align="center"
| 2004 || Grimsby Peach Kings || Simcoe Storm || Won Championship vs. Wingham (W)
|- align="center"
| 2005 || Grimsby Peach Kings || Simcoe Storm || Lost Final vs. Essex (GL)
|- align="center"
| 2006 || Grimsby Peach Kings || Simcoe Storm || Lost Semi-final vs. Essex (GL)
|- align="center"
| 2007 || Grimsby Peach Kings || Norwich Merchants || Lost Semi-final vs. Essex (GL)
|- align="center"
| 2008 || Grimsby Peach Kings || Norwich Merchants || Lost Semi-final vs. Essex (GL)
|- align="center"
| 2009 || Grimsby Peach Kings || Norwich Merchants || Lost Semi-final vs. Essex (GL)
|- align="center"
| 2010 || Grimsby Peach Kings || Norwich Merchants || Lost Semi-final vs. Belle River (GL)
|- align="center"
| 2011 || Grimsby Peach Kings || Norwich Merchants || Won Championship vs. Alliston (GMO)
|- align="center"
| 2012 || Grimsby Peach Kings || New Hamburg Firebirds || Won Championship vs. Alliston (GMO)
|- align="center"
| 2013 || Grimsby Peach Kings' || New Hamburg Firebirds || Lost Semi-final vs. Essex (GL)
|}

|}

Regular Season ChampionsPlease note: Through much of the 1980s and 1990s, the divisions of the league were semi-autonomous and would often have different numbers of games in their schedules.  The winners, in that case, are chosen by winning percentage.  The 2001-02 ended up with the two division leaders with exact records, therefore a tie.''

Former teams
Ancaster Shamrocks
Aylmer Spitfires
Beamsville-Lincoln Blades
Buffalo Trojans
Caledonia Corvairs
Flamborough Colts
Hagersville Flyers
Merritton Centennials
Niagara-on-the-Lake Bicentennials
Port Colborne Sailors
Port Dover Clippers
Rockton Real McCoys
Stoney Creek Warriors
Thorold Paper C's

References

External links
Niagara Junior C Website
OHA Website

C
C
1974 establishments in Ontario
Sports leagues established in 1974
2016 disestablishments in Ontario
Sports leagues disestablished in 2016